Chiral column chromatography is a variant of column chromatography that is employed for the separation of enantiomers, e. g. in racemates. The stationary phase contains a single enantiomer of a chiral compound.

The chiral stationary phase can be prepared by attaching a chiral compound to the surface of an achiral support such as silica gel. Common chiral stationary phases are based on oligosaccharides such as cellulose or cyclodextrin (in particular with β-cyclodextrin, a seven sugar ring molecule). 

The principle can be also applied to the fabrication of monolithic HPLC columns or gas chromatography columns.

References

Chromatography
Stereochemistry